The Christian Brothers University Buccaneers and Lady Buccaneers are the athletic teams that represent Christian Brothers University, located in Memphis, Tennessee, in intercollegiate sports at the Division II level of the National Collegiate Athletic Association (NCAA). The Buccaneers have primarily competed in the Gulf South Conference since the 1996–97 academic year.

Christian Brothers competes in 17 intercollegiate varsity sports. Men's sports include baseball, basketball, cross country, golf, soccer, tennis, and track and field (indoor and outdoor); while women's sports include basketball, cross country, golf, soccer, softball, tennis, track and field (indoor and outdoor), and volleyball.

Conference affiliations 
The Buccaneers began playing in the 1950s as independents.  Over the last half-century, CBU has competed in the NAIA Division I in the Volunteer State Athletic Conference and the Tennessee Collegiate Athletic Conference. Since 1992, CBU has been a member of the NCAA Division II and a member of the Gulf South Conference since 1996.

NAIA
 Volunteer State Athletic Conference (?–1985)
 Tennessee Collegiate Athletic Conference (1985–1996)

NCAA
 Gulf South Conference (1996–present)

Varsity teams 

15% of students participate in intercollegiate sports. Each of these sports, with the exception of golf, offers scholarships to student athletes.

Other athletics at CBU 
In addition to intercollegiate athletics, CBU offers intramural sports. Types of intramurals, such as volleyball, flag football, and bowling, vary from year to year.

Facilities 

Buccaneer and Lady Buccaneer basketball and volleyball teams play at Canale Arena.

Accomplishments

Teams

Lady Buccaneer soccer 
 NCAA Division II national champions, 2002
 Gulf South Conference champions, 2000, 2001 2002, 2003, 2004
 The first Gulf South Conference team to win five consecutive GSC tournaments
 The first five-time Gulf South Conference winner

Buccaneer soccer 
 Memphis Cup winners, 2004
 Tim McCage Cup winners, 2007

Buccaneer basketball 
 Gulf South Conference Champions, 2008, 2012
 NCAA South Regional Champions, 2008
 Beat Memphis Tigers Basketball in a 2014 exhibition match (2 overtimes).

Individuals 
 Missy Gregg, Lady Buccaneer Soccer
 First-team, All-American
 NCAA Tournament Outstanding Offensive Player
 Two-time NSCAA Player of the Year in all divisions
 Tennessee Sports Hall of Fame Female Amateur Athlete of the Year
 Gulf South Conference All-American team
 Honda Award Winner: Division II Athlete of the Year

Notable alumni

Men's soccer 
 Youssef Naciri
 Chandler O'Dwyer

Women's soccer 
 Margaret Saurin

References

External links